Scott Township, Kansas may refer to one of the following places:

 Scott Township, Bourbon County, Kansas
 Scott Township, Lincoln County, Kansas
 Scott Township, Linn County, Kansas
 Scott Township, Scott County, Kansas

See also

Scott Township (disambiguation)

Kansas township disambiguation pages